The rufous-crowned elaenia (Elaenia ruficeps) is a species of bird in the family Tyrannidae. It is found in Brazil, Colombia, French Guiana, Guyana, Suriname, and Venezuela. Its natural habitats are subtropical or tropical moist lowland forests and subtropical or tropical dry shrubland.

References

rufous-crowned elaenia
Birds of the Amazon Basin
Birds of Colombia
Birds of Venezuela
Birds of the Guianas
rufous-crowned elaenia
rufous-crowned elaenia
Taxonomy articles created by Polbot